The Franklin Street station was a local station on the demolished IRT Ninth Avenue Line in Manhattan, New York City. It had three tracks and two side platforms. It was served by trains from the IRT Ninth Avenue Line. It opened on January 21, 1873, and closed on June 11, 1940. The next southbound stop was Warren Street. The next northbound stop was Desbrosses Street.

References

External links 
NYCsubway.org - The IRT Ninth Avenue Elevated Line-Polo Grounds Shuttle

IRT Ninth Avenue Line stations
Railway stations in the United States opened in 1873
Railway stations closed in 1940
Former elevated and subway stations in Manhattan
1873 establishments in New York (state)
1940 disestablishments in New York (state)